The Guilds of the City of Dublin were associations of trade and craft practitioners, with regulatory, mutual benefit and shared religious purposes. In their eventual number they were sometimes called the "25 minor corporations", in contrast to the city's principal authority, the Dublin Corporation). They operated in various forms from near the time of the Norman invasion of Ireland - the Merchants’ Guild existed in some form by 1192 - until the mid-19th century, and a few of which have descendent operations to the present day.

The guild system in Ireland was first established under a royal charter from Prince John in 1192.  It largely ceased between 1840 and 1845, but subsequently some guilds developed residual activities.

The Guilds elected 96 of the up to 144 members of the Common Council, the lower house of the City Assembly, the governing body of Dublin Corporation, with 31 seats controlled by the Merchants Guild, and each of the others electing 2, 3 or 4 Common Councillors. The remainder of the Common Council consisted of up to 48 Sheriffs' Peers, former holders of the office of Sheriff of Dublin City, while the upper house of the Assembly was the Board of Aldermen, with 24 aldermen, the Lord Mayor of Dublin, elected from a slate of nominated aldermen, and two Sheriffs, who had to have a certain level of property value.

List of Guilds of the City of Dublin

See also
 Guild
 Guildhall
 Livery company
 Brotherhood of Saint George - a short-lived Dublin military guild

References

Notes

Guilds in Ireland
Economy of Dublin (city)